Run down, also referred to as rundown, run dun, rondón, fling-me-far, and fling mi for, is a stew dish in Jamaican cuisine and Tobago cuisine. The traditional Jamaican dish is eaten in several Latin American countries that share a coast with the Caribbean Sea.

It consists of a soup made up of reduced coconut milk, with different types of seafood (fish, crabs, small lobsters or shellfish), plantain, yam, tomato, onion, and seasonings. Mackerel and salted mackerel are often used in the dish. Other fish are also used, including locally caught fish, cod, salt cod, shad, other oily fish, red snapper, swordfish, pickled fish, bull pizzle, and cassava. Traditionally, the dish is served with side dishes of dumplings or baked breadfruit.

Run down is typically available in Jamaican restaurants, and is also a traditional Jamaican breakfast dish. It is a common dish in the Antilles, insular Colombia, Honduras, Panama, Costa Rica, Nicaragua and Venezuela, also.

History

Rondón originated in Jamaica and was exported to Latin America by the Afro-Jamaican immigrant workers who migrated in the early 19th century to build projects such as the Panama Canal and the Costa Rican railroads. The dish is unique to the island, which its population, having left their homes in Africa, Europe, and Asia, were forced to use the limited amount of goods (for example, fish and coconut milk) that were wildly available. Although most Jamaicans are of mixed African descent, the dish is not consumed on the African mainland nor on any other continent. It is now, however, consumed by small minorities on the island of Tobago as well as areas of South and Central America that have Jamaican expatriates.

Rondón is a Jamaican Patois anglicism of the words "run down", which describes the "runny" or "liquefied" nature of the sauce. The name could also originate from the manner in which the fish is thoroughly cooked until it falls apart, or "runs down".

Preparation

Since rondón is a traditional dish shared by different countries, the ingredients may vary from region to region. However, coconut milk is an essential ingredient in all the variants.

In Nicaragua, the meat used might be fish, beef, pork or even turtle meat—a common ingredient in Caribbean cuisine but also illegal in some countries—to which seasonings are added. It might include bell peppers, onion, bananas, cassava, elephant's ear and argan. On the Caribbean coast of Costa Rica, the ingredients include cassava, taro, yam, plantain and green bananas. The meat might be fish, lobsters or crabs and spices such as thyme, garlic, onions and yellow lantern chilli or "chile panameño", an important ingredient in Costa Rican cuisine. It can be served with flour dumplings. On the Colombian isle of San Andrés, the ingredients used are fish, snails, other seafood or pork. The vegetables include cassava, taro, plantain, potatoes and the spices used include basil, oregano, peppers, onion, garlic and poultry seasoning. In Panama, the seafood prepared with coconut milk can be served with rice, tostones or "patacones", and salad.

In coastal areas of Colombia, "rundown" refers to conch stew. This dish may be prepared with conch meat, salt pork,  root vegetables, breadfruit and plantains cooked in coconut milk.

In Trinidad, Grenada, and Barbados, a similar dish that utilizes palm oil is referred to as "oil-down", which is generally prepared with salted beef or pork, breadfruit, palm oil and seasonings boiled in coconut milk until it reaches a thick consistency. This dish is similar to yumma, a Koongo dish.

See also

 Cow cod soup
 Fish tea
 List of breakfast foods
 List of Jamaican dishes
 List of stews
 Mannish water
 Stew peas – a similar Jamaican stew

References

External links 
Jiménez Acuña, Ana Carolina (2007). Sazonando la olla. Universidad Estatal a Distancia. p. 234. (Spanish)
Barthley, Ricardo (2003). Rondón de Mariscos. Retrieved on February 5, 2016. (Spanish)
Smith, Sara (2013). Caribbean Rondon Soup. Retrieved on February 5, 2016.
 Sky Juice and Flying Fish: Tastes Of A Continent - Jessica B. Harris - Google Books p. (unlisted).
 Passionate Vegetarian – Crescent Dragonwagon – Google Books p. 206.
 Frommer's Jamaica - Darwin Porter, Danforth Prince - Google Books p. 9.

Caribbean cuisine
Colombian cuisine
Costa Rican cuisine
Fish stews
Foods containing coconut
Jamaican stews
Latin American cuisine
Nicaraguan cuisine
Panamanian cuisine
Trinidad and Tobago cuisine
Venezuelan cuisine